The red-finned triplefin, Helcogramma gymnauchen, is a triplefin blenny of the family Tripterygiidae, found in the western Pacific from Indonesia, Papua New Guinea, and northern Australia, at depths of between 1 and 8 m. It reaches a maximum length of 4 cm.

The red-finned triplefin lives on reefs, and feeds on algae and small invertebrates.

References

Red-finned triplefin
Fish described in 1909